John Peter Shorts (born July 12, 1966) is a former defensive tackle in the National Football League. He was a member of the New England Patriots during the 1989 NFL season. Shorts grew up in the small town of Clinton, Wisconsin and went to Clinton High School (Clinton, Wisconsin)

References

1966 births
American football defensive tackles
American football offensive tackles
American players of Canadian football
Canadian football offensive linemen
Hamilton Tiger-Cats players
Illinois State Redbirds football players
Living people
New England Patriots players
Sportspeople from Janesville, Wisconsin
Players of American football from Wisconsin
Sacramento Gold Miners players
San Antonio Riders players
San Antonio Texans players
Saskatchewan Roughriders players
People from Clinton, Rock County, Wisconsin